The District Council of Munno Mara West was a local government area of South Australia on the central Adelaide Plains from 1854 to 1933.

History
The council was established on 27 April 1854, bringing local government to the western half of the Hundred of Munno Para, the District Council of Munno Para East having been formed the year before.

At the time of its creation, the Munno Para West council area was bounded on the south by the Little Para River (which derives its name from the Kaurna term pari, meaning "stream of flowing water") and on the north by the Gawler River. The eastern boundary the District Council of Munno Para East (Main North Road) and western boundary was Port Wakefield Road. It included the rural townships of Virginia, Smithfield, Penfield, Angle Vale, Salisbury North and Gawler Blocks, the latter being severed by the District Council of Gawler South in 1899 and later merged with the Corporate Town of Gawler.

The council wards of St Kilda and Virginia West were added to the District Council later, in 1886.

Despite a Deputation from the Munno Para West District Council to the Minister of Local Government in May 1933, following a recommendation from  Local Government Areas Commission, the District Council of Munno Para West was abolished on 22 June 1933, when parts were severed and added to District Council of Munno Para East and Municipality of Gawler, and the rest combined with Yatala North to form the new District Council of Salisbury.

Notes

1854 establishments in Australia
1933 disestablishments in Australia
Munno Para West, District Council of